Virai (also Romanized as Vīrā’ī; also known as Shīrāzel, Shīrazīl, Shīreh Zelī, Shīrzellī, and Vīrānī) is a village in Seyyed Jamal ol Din Rural District, in the Central District of Asadabad County, Hamadan Province, Iran. At the 2006 census, its population was 614, in 152 families.

References 

Populated places in Asadabad County